Vulpia bromoides, squirreltail fescue, barren fescue or brome fescue, is a species of grass in the family Poaceae. It is a winter annual native to Europe, North Africa, and West Asia, but has been introduced to parts of the America, South Africa, Australia, New Zealand and isolated parts of East Asia.

References

External links 

Jepson Manual Treatment
  USDA, classification and picture - Vulpia bromoides

Pooideae
Flora of North Africa
Flora of Libya
Flora of Algeria
Plants described in 1753
Taxa named by Asa Gray
Taxa named by Carl Linnaeus